The 2013 National Football Challenge Cup was the 23rd season of National Challenge Cup, the main cup competition in Pakistani football.

A total of 16 clubs entered the competition, the tournament commenced on 15 May 2018. Bahawalpur were the hosts for the tournament, thus earning DFA Bahawalpur a spot in the tournament, courtesy of being the hosts.

Khan Research Laboratories were the defending champions, they were knocked out in quarter finals, losing 5–4 on penalties to the eventual winners National Bank.

National Bank won the tournament, defeating Karachi Electric Supply Corporation 1–0 in the finals. This was the first major trophy for National Bank since 1993, when they won the National Challenge Cup that year.

Teams
The 16 participating teams are as below:

 Khan Research LaboratoriesTH, PPL
 WAPDA
 DFA Bahawalpur H
 Pakistan Army
 Karachi Electric Supply Corporation
 Pakistan Airlines
 Pakistan Airforce
 National Bank
 Habib Bank 
 Pak Afghan Clearing
 Sui Southern Gas
 Ashraf Sugar Mills
 National U-18
 Bhatti United
 Higher Education
 Pakistan Police

Notes TH = Challenge Cup title holders; PPL = Pakistan Premier League winners; H = Host

Group stages

Group A

Group B

Group C

Group D

Knockout round

Quarter finals

Semi finals

Third place

Finals

Top scorers

References

External links
 2013 NFCC RSSSF
 2013 NFCC FPDC

Pakistan National Football Challenge Cup
Cup